Newton is the name of some places in the U.S. state of Wisconsin:

Newton, Manitowoc County, Wisconsin, a town
Newton (community), Manitowoc County, Wisconsin, an unincorporated community
Newtonburg, Wisconsin, an unincorporated community
Newton, Marquette County, Wisconsin, a town
Newton, Vernon County, Wisconsin, an unincorporated community